Frans Vermeyen (25 March 1943 – 18 January 2014) was a Belgian footballer who primarily played as a striker.

Club career
Vermeyen joined Lierse SK in 1959, aged 16. He became a club icon in 14 years and 411 games with the club. A striker-turned-midfielder, he left them for FC Antwerp in 1973 and finished his career at Witgoor.

Death
Frans Vermeyen died in hospital care following a stroke on 18 January 2014, aged 70, in his hometown of Turnhout.

References

External links
 Frans Vermeyen at FC Antwerp
 

1943 births
2014 deaths
Sportspeople from Turnhout
Association football forwards
Belgian footballers
Belgium international footballers
Lierse S.K. players
Royal Antwerp F.C. players
Footballers from Antwerp Province